Yunnanilus elakatis is a species of ray-finned fish, a stone loach, in the genus Yunnanilus. Its type locality is in Yiliang County, Kunming in Yunnan. The specific name refers the spindle-like body shape.

References

E
Taxa named by Cao Wen-Xuan
Taxa named by Zhu Song-Quan
Fish described in 1989